Myron Tarnavsky (  (August 29, 1869 in Baryliv, Galicia, Austria-Hungary now Ukraine – June 29, 1938 in Lviv), was a supreme commander of the Ukrainian Galician Army, the military of the West Ukrainian People's Republic.

Background
Tarnavsky was born into a family of priests in a village in the Lviv region.  He attended a village grade school and a German gymnasium in Brody, western Ukraine. He then served for one year in the Austrian military and due to his good performance was given the opportunity to pursue officer training in Lviv and, later, Vienna.

Military activities
In 1899 Myron Tarnavsky completed officer training in Vienna and was stationed in Sambir and, for a longer period of time, in Zolochiv where as an officer of the Austrian military he played an active role in local Ukrainian community life.

With the outbreak of World War I in 1914, Tarnavsky was assigned to the front and fought against the Russian military.  In 1915 he was wounded but returned to the Russian front, fighting in the Carpathian mountains, later that year.  In 1916, Tarnavsky obtained the rank of major in the Austro-Hungarian army and became the commander of the Ukrainian Sich Riflemen. In 1918 he was promoted to the rank of lieutenant colonel and given command of the 16th infantry regiment, then stationed in central Ukraine. At the end of 1918, Austria-Hungary collapsed and a western Ukrainian state was declared in the formerly Austrian-controlled territory of Galicia. Tarnavsky joined the Ukrainian Galician Army in February 1919, and obtained the rank of colonel.  In July of that year, after Ukrainian forces were driven out of Galicia by the Polish army, Tarnavsky was promoted to the rank of brigadier general and became Supreme Commander of the Ukrainian Galician Army. Tarnavsky oversaw the Galician offensive on Kiev.  His army was decimated by a typhus epidemic and he arranged an armistice with the forces of Anton Denikin.  Because this was unauthorized by the Ukrainian policial leadership and he was relieved of duty and court-martialed in November 1919.  Tarnavsky was then acquitted and briefly reinstated as supreme commander.

References

1869 births
1938 deaths
People from Lviv Oblast
People from the Kingdom of Galicia and Lodomeria
Ukrainian Austro-Hungarians
Ukrainian military personnel
Ukrainian Galician Army people
Austro-Hungarian military personnel of World War I
Ukrainian people of the Polish–Ukrainian War
Recipients of the Iron Cross, 2nd class
Burials at Yaniv Cemetery